Henry Ashurst may refer to:
 Henry F. Ashurst (1874–1962), U.S. Senator from Arizona, 1912–1941
 Sir Henry Ashurst, 1st Baronet (1645–1711), English Member of Parliament for Truro, 1681–1695, and Wilton, 1698–1701 and 1701–1702
 Sir Henry Ashurst, 2nd Baronet (c. 1670–1732), English Member of Parliament for Windsor, 1715–1722
Henry Ashurst (merchant) (c. 1614–1680), English merchant
Henry Ashurst (town clerk) (1669–1705), Town Clerk of London

See also
Ashurst (surname)